A notice period or "period of notice" within a contract may by defined within the contract itself, or subject to a condition of reasonableness. In an employment contract, a notice period is a period of time between the receipt of the letter of dismissal and the end of the last working day. This time period does not have to be given to an employee by their employer before their employment ends. The term also refers to the period between a termination date or resignation date and the last working day in the company when an employee leaves or when a contract ends.

The duration of a reasonable notice period depends on the particular facts of a particular case.

Notice periods in employment law

Statutory redundancy notice periods in the UK
In the United Kingdom, the statutory redundancy notice periods are:
at least one week's notice if employed between one month and two years
one week's notice for each year if employed between two and twelve years
twelve weeks' notice if employed for twelve years or more.

These statutory periods constitute the minimum notice period to be given by the employer; however, some employers may opt to give employees longer notice periods, in order to give the employees a better opportunity to find alternative employment.

Notice periods in Poland
In Poland the same notice period applies regardless of which party (employer or employee) withdraws the contract. The statutory periods apply, unless both parties agree on other terms:
 2 weeks if employed below 6 months
 1 month if employed below 3 years
 3 months if employed 3 or more years.

The week-measured period ends on Saturday. The month-measured period ends on the last day of calendar month—for instance, if 1-month period applies, a resignation or dismissal produced between 1st and 30 April results in contract termination on 31 May.

Notice periods in the United States
Because most employment in the U.S. is at-will, no notice period is required. In practice, most employees provide two weeks' notice.

Notice periods in Denmark
Notice periods for white collar workers are defined in the Danish Law on Salaried Employees or "Funktionærloven", which are:
 1 month if employed below 6 months
 3 months if employed below 3 years
 4 months if employed below 6 years
 5 months if employed below 9 years
 6 months if employed more than 9 years.

If the employee resigns, he/she has to give a 1-month notice period.

Notice periods in Switzerland 
Notice periods in Switzerland are governed by the Code of Obligations, which sets the default time scales. The notice period depends on the employee’s length of service within the company as follows:

 7 days during the trial period
 1 month if employed below 1 year
 2 months if employed below 10 years
 3 months if employed more than 10 years

The default trial period is the first month of employment, but may be extended up to three months. After the trial period, the notice period may be amended by a written contract, but not under one month, unless set by a collective labor agreement and only for the first year of employment.

Notes

References 

Termination of employment